The 1943 Major League Baseball All-Star Game was the 11th playing of the midsummer classic between the all-stars of the American League (AL) and National League (NL), the two leagues comprising Major League Baseball. The game was held on July 13, 1943, at Shibe Park in Philadelphia, the home of the Philadelphia Athletics of the American League. The game resulted in the American League defeating the National League 5–3.

This was the first major league All-Star Game scheduled as a night game.

Athletics in the game
The lone representative of the host team was Dick Siebert, starting first baseman for the AL, who was hitless in one at bat.

Starting lineups
Players in italics have since been inducted into the National Baseball Hall of Fame.

National League
 Stan Hack, 3b
 Billy Herman, 2b
 Stan Musial, lf
 Bill Nicholson, rf
 Elbie Fletcher, 1b – starting in place of Frank McCormick, due to injury
 Walker Cooper, c
 Harry Walker, cf
 Marty Marion, ss
 Mort Cooper, p

American League
 George Case, rf
 Ken Keltner, 3b
 Dick Wakefield, lf
 Vern Stephens, ss
 Dick Siebert, 1b
 Chet Laabs, cf
 Jake Early, c
 Bobby Doerr, 2b
 Dutch Leonard, p

Umpires

The umpires changed assignments in the middle of the fifth inning – Rommel and Dunn swapped positions, also Conlan and Rue swapped positions.

Synopsis

The NL started the game with two singles, then scored one run on a sacrifice fly by Stan Musial.  The AL jumped ahead 3–1 in the bottom of the 2nd, on a pair of walks followed by a home run from Bobby Doerr. The AL added a run in the 3rd, on back-to-back doubles by Ken Keltner and Dick Wakefield, and another run in the bottom of the 5th, on an error by NL second baseman Billy Herman with runners on first and third with two outs; the AL was up 5–1.  The NL later got two runs back from Vince DiMaggio; in the 7th he hit a triple and then scored on a sacrifice fly by Dixie Walker, and in the 9th he led off the inning with a home run.  But the NL was unable to rally further, resulting in an AL 5–3 victory.

References

External links
Baseball Almanac
Baseball-Reference.com

All-Star Game
1943
1943
Major League
July 1943 sports events
1940s in Philadelphia